Gordon Ray Roberts (born 14 June 1950) is a retired United States Army officer and a Medal of Honor recipient for his "conspicuous gallantry and intrepidity in action at the risk of his life above and beyond the call of duty" on 11 July 1969 while an infantryman with the 1st Battalion, 506th Infantry, 101st Airborne Division during the Vietnam War.

Early life
Gordon Roberts was born in Middletown, Ohio on 14 June 1950. His hometown is Lebanon, Ohio.

Vietnam service

Three days after Roberts graduated from high school, he enlisted in the United States Army in May 1968. He went through training at Fort Benning, Georgia, and then attended infantry school. Roberts was placed in Company B, 1st Battalion, 506th Infantry Regiment, 101st Airborne Division, and deployed to the Republic of Vietnam in April 1969.

By 11 July 1969, Roberts had already distinguished himself, being awarded both the Silver Star and the Bronze Star. On that day, Roberts single-handedly wiped out three machine gun nests, saving the lives of over 20 fellow soldiers on Hill 996 during Operation Montgomery Rendezvous. Roberts spent 14 months in Vietnam until he returned to the United States in June 1970.

On 2 March 1971, he was awarded the Medal of Honor by President Richard M. Nixon for his actions on 11 July 1969. Roberts was the youngest living Medal of Honor recipient and the only one still on active duty until 2010, when Army Staff Sergeant Salvatore Giunta was awarded the medal.

Post-Vietnam life
Following his first enlistment in the army, Roberts attended the University of Dayton and received a bachelor's degree in sociology in 1974. He married and became the father of a son and a daughter. After eighteen years as a social worker, he returned to the Army and received a direct commission as an officer and entered active duty in 1991. His past assignments include eight years of company and field grade command assignments in Korea, Fort Bragg, Haiti, Fort Gordon and Iraq as well as staff assignments at Hunter Army Airfield, Fort Benning, and Kuwait. From June 2008 through June 2010 he served as the Brigade Commander for Walter Reed Army Medical Center. On 1 July 2010, he began duty as command surgeon for the 1st Sustainment Command (Theater) at Fort Bragg, North Carolina. He later assumed duties as the unit's forward Chief of Staff at Camp Arifjan, Kuwait.

Roberts retired from the army on 18 May 2012.

Awards and decorations
In addition to the Medal of Honor, Gordon Roberts's military awards include the Silver Star, the Bronze Star, the Air Medal, the Army Commendation Medal, the National Defense Service Medal, the Vietnam Service Medal, the Republic of Vietnam Campaign Medal, the Combat Infantryman Badge, the Parachutist Badge, and the Presidential Unit Citation.

Badges

  Combat Infantryman Badge
  Parachutist Badge

Medal of Honor citation

See also

List of Medal of Honor recipients for the Vietnam War

References
Citations

General references

1950 births
United States Army personnel of the Iraq War
United States Army personnel of the Vietnam War
Living people
People from Lebanon, Ohio
People from Middletown, Ohio
Recipients of the Air Medal
Recipients of the Legion of Merit
Recipients of the Silver Star
United States Army Medal of Honor recipients
United States Army officers
Vietnam War recipients of the Medal of Honor